Likely is a surname. Notable people with the surname include:

Isaiah Likely (born 2000), American football tight end
William Likely (born 1994), American football cornerback

See also
Likely McBrien (1892–1956), Australian politician and rules football administrator
Likely (disambiguation)